The Park Federico García Lorca is a park situated in Arabial St., Granada, Spain. It is named after the Spanish poet Federico García Lorca. It is designed with many sunny alleys and palm trees.

The park is opened to the public during daylight hours. Admission is free.

Parks in Spain
Granada
Protected areas of Andalusia
Federico García Lorca
Bien de Interés Cultural landmarks in the Province of Granada